Marek Krajčovič (born 3 August 1992 in Bratislava) is a Slovak sprint canoeist. At the 2012 Summer Olympics, he competed in the Men's K-1 1000 metres.

References

Slovak male canoeists
Living people
Olympic canoeists of Slovakia
Canoeists at the 2012 Summer Olympics
1992 births
European Games competitors for Slovakia
Canoeists at the 2015 European Games
Sportspeople from Bratislava